Kevin Peter Johnson (born 29 August 1952 in Doncaster) is an English former professional footballer who played as a midfielder in the Football League for Sheffield Wednesday, Southend United, Gillingham, Workington, Hartlepool United, Huddersfield Town and Halifax Town, and non-league football for Gateshead, during the 1970s and 1980s.

References

External links
 

1952 births
Living people
Footballers from Doncaster
English footballers
Association football midfielders
Sheffield Wednesday F.C. players
Southend United F.C. players
Gillingham F.C. players
Workington A.F.C. players
Hartlepool United F.C. players
Huddersfield Town A.F.C. players
Halifax Town A.F.C. players
Gateshead F.C. players
English Football League players